The Anglican Diocese of Ndokwa is one of 12 dioceses within the Anglican Province of Bendel, itself one of 14 provinces within the Church of Nigeria. The  current bishop is David Obiosa.

Inauguration 
The Diocese of Ndokwa was inaugurated on the 4th of June 2008 with The Rt. Rev'd. David Obiosa as the pioneer Bishop

Notes

Church of Nigeria dioceses
Dioceses of the Province of Bendel